Kosmos 1546 ( meaning Cosmos 1546) is a Soviet US-KS missile early warning satellite which was launched in 1984 as part of the Oko programme. The satellite is designed to identify missile launches using optical telescopes and infrared sensors.

Kosmos 1546 was launched from Site 200/40 at Baikonur Cosmodrome in the Kazakh SSR. A Proton-K carrier rocket with a DM upper stage was used to perform the launch, which took place at 05:53 UTC on 29 March 1984. The launch successfully placed the satellite into geostationary orbit. It subsequently received its Kosmos designation, and the international designator 1984-031A. The United States Space Command assigned it the Satellite Catalog Number 14867.

It was operational for about 30 months.

See also

List of Kosmos satellites (1501–1750)

References

1984 in spaceflight
Spacecraft launched by Proton rockets
Kosmos satellites
Oko
1984 in the Soviet Union
Spacecraft launched in 1984